Aladdin is a Disney media franchise comprising a film series and additional media. It began with the 1992 American animated feature of the same name, which was based on the tale of the same name, and was directed by Ron Clements and John Musker. The success of the film led to two direct-to-video sequels, a television series (which had a crossover episode with Hercules: The Animated Series), a Broadway musical, a live-action film adaptation, various rides and themed areas in Disney's theme parks, several video games, and merchandise, among other related works.

Films

Animated films

Aladdin (1992)

Aladdin was released in 1992. The 31st Disney animated feature film was directed by John Musker and Ron Clements, and is based on the Arabic folktale of Aladdin and the Magic Lamp from the One Thousand and One Nights. The plot follows street urchin Aladdin as he attempts to gain the affection of Princess Jasmine after acquiring a magic lamp.

The Return of Jafar (1994)

Aladdin was followed by Disney's first direct-to-video sequel, The Return of Jafar in 1994. The plot mainly focused on Jafar seeking revenge on Aladdin. However, this time, with Iago on Aladdin's side, Abis Mal becomes Jafar's new henchman. Now, Aladdin and co. must find a way to thwart Jafar, with his limitless genie power.

Aladdin and the King of Thieves (1996)

In 1996, the second sequel to Aladdin, Aladdin and the King of Thieves was released on video. The story concludes as Aladdin and Jasmine are about to have their wedding and Aladdin discovers that his father is still alive, but is the leader of the Forty Thieves.

More Than a Peacock Princess (2007) 

In 2005, screenwriter Robert Reece, who co-wrote Cinderella III: A Twist in Time and The Little Mermaid: Ariel's Beginning, pitched a fourth Aladdin feature to DisneyToon Studios execs, although it never came to fruition. In 2007, DisneyToon Studios produced Disney Princess Enchanted Tales: Follow Your Dreams, a crossover film with Sleeping Beauty. The second half of the film, More Than a Peacock Princess, follows Princess Jasmine, sometime after the events of Aladdin and the King of Thieves as she becomes tired and bored of her usual princess duties, and upon requesting more responsibility from her father, is assigned the role of Royal Assistant Educator.

Live-action films

Aladdin (2019)

A live-action Aladdin movie was released on May 24, 2019, directed by Guy Ritchie with John August as the writer and Dan Lin and Jonathan Eirich as the producers and stars Mena Massoud as Aladdin, Naomi Scott as Princess Jasmine, Marwan Kenzari as Jafar and Will Smith as Genie.

Untitled Aladdin sequel (TBA)
On August 12, 2019, producer Dan Lin announced his enthusiasm for a sequel and revealed that Disney is in the early stages of developing a follow-up. The studio also hopes to bring back Guy Ritchie to direct and Will Smith to reprise his role as The Genie while also telling a story that's "fresh and new". On February 12, 2020, it was announced that Ritchie will be returning as director with Lin and Jonathan Eirich returning as producers. In addition, Ryan Halprin joined the film as executive producer.

Untitled Prince Anders spin-off (TBA)
On December 6, 2019, The Hollywood Reporter reported that Disney was in the early stages of developing a spin-off of Aladdin for Disney+ centered on Prince Anders, tentatively titled Prince Anders, with Jordan Dunn and Michael Kvamme writing the script and Billy Magnussen reprising his role.

Genies (TBA)  
On July 15, 2015, it was reported that a live-action prequel to Aladdin (2019) was in development under the title Genies. The new film will reportedly focus on genies and their realm and reveal how Aladdin's genie ended up in the lamp. The film was being written by Damian Shannon and Mark Swift. Tripp Vinson was to serve as a producer through Vinson Films.

Television

Aladdin (1994–1995; 1999)

Shortly after The Return of Jafar, an animated series was produced. The episodes focused on Aladdin's adventures after the events of the second film.

The Aladdin characters later made a crossover with Hercules: The Animated Series, and were featured as guests in the television series House of Mouse and related works to those series—Jafar was the leader of the villains in Mickey's House of Villains.

Descendants (2015–2019)

Descendants is a live-action Disney Channel Original film series based on the lives of the children of various Disney heroes and villains when they attend the same prep school. Jafar appears in the first film as does his son, Jay, who additionally appears its two sequels.

Agrabah

Agrabah is a fictional sultanate that serves as the setting for the Aladdin franchise. Aladdin was initially intended to be set in the Iraqi city of Baghdad, but after the Gulf War happened, the name Agrabah was chosen as an approximate anagram of the name of the city of Baghdad.

Cast and characters

Crew

Reception

Box office performance

Home media performance

Critical and audience response

Music

Video games
Along with the film release, three different video games based on Aladdin were released. Disney's Aladdin, an international co-production between Virgin Games and Walt Disney Feature Animation for the Genesis, was released in late 1993 and later ported to Nintendo Entertainment System, PC, Game Boy and Game Boy Color. That same year, Capcom released a Super NES game, also called Disney's Aladdin, which was ported to the Game Boy Advance in 2002. In 1994, SIMS released another game called Disney's Aladdin for the Game Gear and Master System. These video games based on the original Aladdin film earned  in sales revenue.

The television series inspired another game by Argonaut Games, entitled Aladdin: Nasira's Revenge and released in 2000 for the PlayStation and PC. Also, in 2004 Vivendi Universal released Disney's Aladdin Chess Adventures, a chess computer game with the Aladdin license.

The Kingdom Hearts series features a playable Aladdin world known as Agrabah. In Kingdom Hearts and Kingdom Hearts: Chain of Memories, the plotline is loosely related to the storyline of the original film. In Kingdom Hearts II, it is a mixture of Aladdin and The Return of Jafar. Genie is also a recurring summon in the series.

Aladdin, Jasmine, and the Genie appeared in the 2011 motion-controlled game, Kinect: Disneyland Adventures, as meet-and-greet characters. Aladdin was also referenced throughout the Disney Infinity series via power discs and in-game toys, with Aladdin and Jasmine being added to the series as playable characters in the series' second game, Disney Infinity 2.0.

During a limited time Event focused on Aladdin, the world builder game Disney Magic Kingdoms included Aladdin, Jasmine, Genie, Abu, Carpet, Jafar and Iago as playable characters, along with some attractions based on the franchise, and costumes of Prince Ali and Purple Dress for Aladdin and Jasmine, respectively. The Sultan and Rajah were also included as playable characters in a later update of the game. In the game the characters are involved in new storylines that serve as a continuation of the Aladdin animated film (ignoring other material in the franchise).

Disney's Aladdin by Virgin Games

Disney's Aladdin was developed for the Mega Drive by Virgin Interactive's studio of Virgin Games USA and published by Sega in 1993. This was due to the fact that Sega had both obtained a license for publishing video games based on Disney's motion picture and established a collaboration deal with Disney's animation studios which was a first in the video game industry, so Sega of America tasked the Virgin Games USA development team with the programming duties because of their successful previous efforts with McDonald's Global Gladiators and 7 Up's Cool Spot. The game has been noted for its use of traditional animation, which was produced by Disney animators under the supervision of Virgin's animation staff, including animation producer Andy Luckey, technical director Paul Schmiedeke and animation director Mike Dietz, using an in-house "Digicel" process to compress the data onto the cartridge. The game also featured arrangements and original compositions composed by Donald S. Griffin.

Disney's Aladdin by Capcom

 was developed for the Super NES and published by Capcom separately from Virgin's version, since Capcom still held Disney licensing rights for Nintendo consoles at the time of the film's release. Although the game is still a side-scrolling platformer, it is significantly different in both presentation and gameplay. Similarly following the movie's storyline, players control Aladdin as he jumps on enemies, vaults off stumps and performs various acrobatic feats to get through levels. Throughout the level, Aladdin can collect apples to throw at enemies and golden scarabs which unlock bonus stages. Throughout each level there are various diamonds (collecting all within a level also unlocking bonus stages), with players able to unlock an extra challenge if they collect 70 red diamonds. The game was later ported to the Game Boy Advance with extra stages, though all the songs based directly on the original movie were replaced with new music, possibly because of copyright reasons. It was also unofficially ported to the NES in 1995 by Hummer Team.

Disney's Aladdin by SIMS

Disney's Aladdin was developed by SIMS and published by Sega, and released in 1994 for the Game Gear worldwide and for the Master System in Europe. Sega went on to produce this game since they already had the necessary intellectual property licensing rights in order to publish the Virgin Interactive game on the Mega Drive/Genesis. The game is also significantly different in gameplay compared to its Mega Drive counterpart. There are three main types of level, chase levels in which Aladdin must outrun enemies while dodging obstacles, exploration levels in which Aladdin must carefully navigate traps and solve puzzles, similar to Prince of Persia, and carpet levels in which Aladdin rides his flying carpet. It also, unlike its 16-bit counterparts, fairly closely follow the plot of the movie, even including cut scenes containing entire dialogue scenes from the movie.

Aladdin the Series: Tower of Gold Adventure
Aladdin the Series: Tower of Gold Adventure is a handheld electronic game that was developed and published by Tiger Electronics in 1994 in the United States. It is based on the television series of the same name.

Disney's Aladdin Activity Center

Disney's Aladdin Activity Center is part of the Disney's Activity Center series.

Disney's Aladdin Print Studio

Disney's Aladdin Print Studio is part of the Disney's Print Studio series.

Disney's Aladdin in Nasira's Revenge

Disney's Aladdin in Nasira's Revenge is the Aladdin franchise video game which was developed for the PlayStation and PC by Argonaut Games and distributed by Disney Interactive in 2001. The game is set after the events of The Return of Jafar, during the television series, and before Aladdin and the King of Thieves. The legendary city of Agrabah is in trouble again: the evil sorceress Nasira (Jodi Benson) is out to avenge the death of her brother, the nefarious sorcerer Jafar (Jonathan Freeman). She begins her vengeful plot by taking over the palace with a spell and kidnapping Princess Jasmine (Linda Larkin) and the Sultan; she then commands the guard's captain Razoul (Jim Cummings) to bring Aladdin (Scott Weinger) to her. The treacherous Nasira believes that if she collects a set of ancient relics that are spread all over Agrabah she might be able to revive Jafar and take over the world, and so she uses her captives to force Aladdin into doing this job for her.

Disney's Aladdin Pinball
Disney's Aladdin Pinball is video game developed for Windows by Disney Interactive and published by Disney Online. It was released on July 11, 2005. The game consists of three separate pinball tables that can be traversed in a single game. They include The Market Place, The Cave of Wonders, and the Royal Palace.

Critical reception

Adaptations

Musical theatre

In November 2010 Alan Menken confirmed that a musical theatre adaptation of the show is in the works with a book written by Chad Beguelin. The show premiered at the 5th Avenue Theatre from July 7–31, 2011. Jonathan Freeman, who voiced Jafar in the film, played the role in the stage adaptation. Adam Jacobs and Courtney Reed played Aladdin and Jasmine. Additional actors included Seán G. Griffin as the Sultan; Don Darryl Rivera as Iago; and, playing Omar, Babkak, and Kassim – a trio of characters originally conceived by the film's creators but not used – Andrew Keenan-Bolger, Brian Gonzales, and Brandon O'Neill. The show was also directed and choreographed by Casey Nicholaw. Another production of the musical played at the Muny Theatre in St. Louis from July 5–13, 2012. The musical premiered on Broadway on February 26, 2014 (in previews) and officially opened on March 20, 2014 at the New Amsterdam Theatre, taking the place of Mary Poppins. The musical had a pre-Broadway tryout at the Ed Mirvish Theatre in Toronto lasting from November 13, 2013 to January 12, 2014. Casey Nicholaw directed and choreographed, with Chad Beguelin writing the book and additional lyrics, Bob Crowley as the scene designer, and costume design by Gregg Barnes.
Aladdin the musical was also opened at Tokyo's Dentsu Shiki Theatre Umi in May 2015. It had its European premiere in December 2015 at the Stage Theatre Neue Flora in Hamburg. It opened in Sydney and London's West End in 2016.

In addition, a stage adaptation of the movie has been created for younger students, known as Disney's Aladdin Jr. Licensing and performing rights are currently being held by Music Theatre International. MTI licenses both a "Kids" version (which uses doubling to foster more of an ensemble feeling among young children) and a "Dual Language" version (which takes the Junior version and adds an element of half the characters speaking only in Spanish).

A recording of the show will be release on Disney+ in 2023.

Novels
In 2015 Disney Press launched a young adult novel series that retells Disney films but with certain elements changed. The first novel in the series is A Whole New World: A Twisted Tale, written by Liz Braswell, a dark fantasy which retells the film but with Jafar gaining control of the genie before Aladdin does.

Attractions
 The Magic Carpets of Aladdin, a Dumbo the Flying Elephant-like ride (Magic Kingdom at Walt Disney World Resort; and Walt Disney Studios Park at Disneyland Resort Paris).
 Arabian Coast
 Le Passage Enchanté d'Aladdin
 Adventureland Bazaar
The film also inspired a Disney On Ice presentation, as well as the show Disney's Aladdin: A Musical Spectacular at Disney California Adventure Park.

Meet and greets
Aladdin, Jasmine, Genie and the Sultan, and occasionally Jafar all appear as meetable characters in the Disney Parks and Resorts. They are all usually based in Adventureland.

Notes

References

 
Film series introduced in 1992
Walt Disney Studios (division) franchises